Elachista eurychora is a species of moth in the family Elachistidae. This species is endemic to New Zealand and has only been collected at Paekākāriki. The habitat where the adult moth was originally collected was in rough vegetation on coastal sandhills or dunes but the collection locality has been significantly modified since that time. It has been hypothesised that the host of the larvae of this species is a grass. Adults are on the wing in March. It is classified as "Data Deficient" by the Department of Conservation.

Taxonomy 

This species was originally described by Edward Meyrick in 1919 and named Irenicoves eurychora. Hudson discussed and illustrated this species under that name in his 1928 publication The Butterflies and Moths of New Zealand. In 1971 Elwood Zimmerman photographed and illustrated this species and reassigned it to the family Elachistidae. In 1999 Lauri Kaila revised the family Elachistidae and confirmed the placement of this species within the genus Elachista. The holotype specimen is held at the Natural History Museum, London.

Description 

Meyrick described the species as follows:

Distribution 

This is endemic in New Zealand. This species has only been found in the Wellington region. Hudson's specimen is the only time this species has been collected.

Host and habitat 
It has been hypothesised that the host of the larvae of this species is a grass. The habitat where the adult moth was originally collected was in rough vegetation on coastal sandhills or dunes. However this locality has been significantly modified since that time.

Behaviour 
Adults of this species are on the wing in March.

Conservation status 
This species has been classified as having the "Data Deficient" conservation status under the New Zealand Threat Classification System.

References 

Moths described in 1919
eurychora
Moths of New Zealand
Taxa named by Edward Meyrick
Endemic fauna of New Zealand
Endemic moths of New Zealand